George William Thomas (born 14 November 2003) is an English cricketer. He made his List A debut on 10 August 2021, for Somerset in the 2021 Royal London One-Day Cup. In December 2021, he was named in England's team for the 2022 ICC Under-19 Cricket World Cup in the West Indies.

References

External links
 

2003 births
Living people
English cricketers
Somerset cricketers
Sportspeople from Taunton
People educated at King's College, Taunton